Michi Nakanishi (Japanese: 中西 みち, later Kurihara; January 30, 1913 – December 30, 1991) was a Japanese sprinter. She competed at the 1932 Summer Olympics in the 80 m hurdles and 4 × 100 m sprint events, and placed fifth in the relay.

References

1913 births
1991 deaths
Japanese female sprinters
Japanese female hurdlers
Olympic athletes of Japan
Athletes (track and field) at the 1932 Summer Olympics
Japan Championships in Athletics winners
20th-century Japanese women